Ona Grauer is a Canadian-Mexican actress best known for her portrayal of the Ancient Ayiana and later Emily Young in the science fiction television series Stargate Universe, part of the Stargate franchise. In the FX show Archer, she voices recurring character Katya Kazanova, and a woman impersonating film star Veronica Deane.

Grauer has one son and one daughter.

Filmography

References

External links

Canadian film actresses
Canadian television actresses
Living people
Naturalized citizens of Canada
People from Nelson, British Columbia
1975 births
Canadian people of Mexican descent
Canadian people of Hungarian descent
Canadian people of Norwegian descent
Mexican people of Hungarian descent
Mexican people of Norwegian descent